Vinícius da Silva Salles (born 30 October 1982), commonly known as Vinícius da Silva, is a Brazilian footballer.

Club career

Brazil
Vinícius began his professional career in 1998 in Brazil with São Paulo-based Comercial Futebol Clube. In 2000, he moved to another São Paulo-based club Associação Portuguesa de Desportos.

Greece
He first moved out of Brazil in 2004 to Europe and more accurately to Greece where he signed a one-year contract with Athens-based Ethnikos Asteras F.C. In 2005, he again signed a contract with an Athens-based club Akratitos F.C.

Back to Brazil
In 2006, he came back to Brazil and signed a one-year contract with Silva Jardim Futebol Clube.

Saudi Arabia
In 2008, he again made a move out of Brazil and this time to the Middle East and more accurately to Saudi Arabia where he signed a one-year contract with Najran-based Najran SC.

Kuwait
In 2009, he again moved to a Middle Eastern country and this time to Kuwait where he signed a one-year contract with Al-Tadamun SC.

Jordan
In 2010, he again moved to a Middle Eastern country and this time to Jordan where he signed a two-year contract with Shabab Al-Ordon Club.

Bahrain
After a one and a half-year spell with Shabab Al-Ordon Club of Jordan, he moved to Bahrain where he signed a six-month contract with Al-Muharraq SC. He helped his club to achieve the runners-up place in the 2012 GCC Champions League.

Oman

In December 2012, he again moved to a Middle Eastern country and this time to Oman where he signed a two-year contract with Saham SC. He helped the club to achieve the runners-up place in the 2012–13 Oman Federation Cup, win the 2013 Oman Professional League Cup and achieve the runners-up place in the 2014 GCC Champions League.

Club career statistics

Honours

Club
With Al-Muharraq
GCC Champions League (0): Runner-up 2012
With Saham
Oman Professional League Cup (1): 2013 Runner-up 2012
GCC Champions League (0): Runner-up 2014

References

External links
 
 
 Vinícius da Silva Salles - YouTube

1982 births
Living people
Brazilian footballers
Brazilian expatriate footballers
Najran SC players
Shabab Al-Ordon Club players
Al-Muharraq SC players
Saham SC players
Brazilian expatriate sportspeople in Greece
Expatriate footballers in Greece
Brazilian expatriate sportspeople in Saudi Arabia
Expatriate footballers in Saudi Arabia
Brazilian expatriate sportspeople in Kuwait
Expatriate footballers in Kuwait
Brazilian expatriate sportspeople in Bahrain
Expatriate footballers in Bahrain
Brazilian expatriate sportspeople in Oman
Expatriate footballers in Oman
Expatriate footballers in Jordan
Saudi Professional League players
Association football fullbacks
A.P.O. Akratitos Ano Liosia players
Kuwait Premier League players
Brazilian expatriate sportspeople in Jordan
Jordanian Pro League players
Ethnikos Asteras F.C. players
Bahraini Premier League players
Al Tadhamon SC players
Oman Professional League players
People from Ribeirão Preto
Footballers from São Paulo (state)